Zone coverage (also referred to as a zone defense) is a defense scheme in gridiron football used to protect against the pass.

Zone coverage schemes require the linebackers and defensive backs to work together to cover certain areas of the field, making it difficult for the opposing quarterback to complete passes. Zone defenses will generally require linebackers to cover the short and midrange area in the middle of the field, in front of the safeties. In the case where one or two linebackers blitz, the remaining linebacker(s) expands his zone to cover the zone responsibilities of the vacating linebacker(s). Often, blitzing will leave larger holes in the pass defense, but it is a gamble the defensive coordinator wants to make to pressure the quarterback into a poor decision and hopefully an interception or at least an incompletion.

Coverage shells
In the following, "cover" refers to the "shell" that the defense rolls into after the snap of the ball, more specifically the number of defenders guarding the deep portion of the field.

In passing situations, the defense will assign players to guard portions of the field, forming a defensive "shell" that the defense hopes will either prevent the offense from completing a pass or ensure a defensive player is able to tackle the receiver after a completed pass. The general terminology used to describe this alignment is "Cover #," with "#" being the number of defensive players forming the coverage shell.

Cover 1
Cover One is a man-to-man coverage for all the defensive backs except for one player (usually a safety) who is not assigned a man to cover but rather plays deep and reacts to the development of the play. Often the safety will remain in a pass coverage position and play a zone defense by guarding the middle of the secondary, reacting to runs or completed passes and double-teaming a receiver if needed.

In a traditional Cover 1, the free safety plays deep and all of the other defenders lock in man coverage to an assigned player for the duration of the play. Essentially, during the pre-snap read, each defender identifies the coverage responsibilities and does not change the assignment. Some teams play a variant of the Cover 1 called Cover 7. In Cover 7, the free safety still plays deep, but the underneath coverage is much more flexible and the defenders switch assignments as the play develops in an attempt to improve defensive positions to make a play on the ball. Examples of these switches include double covering a certain receiver and using defensive help to undercut a route to block a throwing lane.

Advantages
Cover 1 schemes are usually very aggressive, preferring to proactively disrupt the offense by giving the quarterback little time to make a decision while collapsing the pocket quickly. This is the main advantage of Cover 1 schemes—the ability to blitz from various pre-snap formations while engaging in complex man-to-man coverage schemes post-snap. For example, a safety may blitz while a cornerback is locked in man coverage with a receiver. Or the cornerback may blitz with the safety rotating into man coverage on the receiver post-snap.

Disadvantages
The main weakness of the Cover 1 scheme is that there is only one deep defender that must cover a large amount of field and provide help on any deep threats. Offenses can attack Cover 1 schemes by sending two receivers on deep routes, provided that the quarterback has enough time for his receivers to get open. The deep defender must decide which receiver to help out on, leaving the other in man coverage which may be a mismatch.

A secondary weakness is inherent in its design: the use of man coverage opens up yards after catch lanes. Man coverage is attacked by offenses in various ways that try to isolate their best athletes on defenders by passing them the ball quickly before the defender can react or designing plays that clear defenders from certain areas thus opening yards after catch lanes.

Cover 2

In traditional Cover 2 schemes the free safety (FS) and strong safety (SS) have deep responsibilities, each guarding half of the field. The NFL's Tampa Bay Buccaneers, Indianapolis Colts, Chicago Bears, and New York Giants run a variant of this defense called the Tampa 2.  The primary difference between traditional cover 2 and Tampa-2 is the responsibility of the middle linebacker.  In traditional cover 2, the middle linebacker covers the underneath zone, with the two safeties taking responsibility for half of the field in the deep zone.  Tampa 2 is a hybrid of cover 2 and cover 3 (see below) where the deep safeties have responsibility only for the deep zone "outside the hashes", while the middle linebacker drops into the middle quarter of the field, covering deep passes between the hash marks.  

Cover 2 can be run from any seven-man defensive fronts such as the 3-4 and the 4-3. (It is difficult to implement Cover 2 from an eight-in-the-box front, because the strong safety or someone replacing him is usually the eighth man). Various "underneath" coverage played by cornerbacks and linebackers may also be implemented. For example, Cover 2 Man means 2 safeties have deep responsibility while the cornerbacks and linebackers follow their offensive assignment in one-on-one coverage. Cover 2 can also be paired with underneath zone schemes: Cover 2 Zone refers to 2 safeties with deep responsibility but now the CBs and LBs drop back into specific coverage zones where they defend passes only in their assigned area.

Teams that play Cover 2 shells usually subscribe to the "bend-but-don't-break" philosophy, preferring to keep offensive players in front of them for short gains while limiting long passes. This is in stark contrast to a more aggressive Cover 1 type scheme which leaves the offensive team's wide receivers in single man-to-man coverage with only one deep helper. By splitting the deep field between two defenders, the defense can drastically reduce the number of long gains.

In Cover 2 the cornerbacks are considered to be "hard" corners, meaning that they have increased run stopping responsibilities and generally defend against shorter passes, although if two receivers run a deep route on a certain side of the field, that side's corner has deep coverage responsibility as well. The "hard" corners also generally bear the responsibility of "pressing" or "jamming" the offensive receivers- disrupting the receivers intended path downfield. It also relies heavily on the "Mike" (Middle) linebacker's ability to quickly drop deep downfield into pass coverage when he reads a pass.

A variant of cover two is the Inverted Cover 2, in which either right before or after the snap the corners "bail" out while the safeties come up—in effect switching responsibilities. This strategy may be employed to trick a quarterback who has not correctly interpreted the shift. The main drawback here is that the middle of the field is left open.

Advantages
The advantage of cover 2 is that it provides great versatility to the defense as the corners can play run, short pass, and deep pass with the confidence that they have support from two deep safeties.

Disadvantages
The main weakness of the Cover 2 shell occurs in the middle of the field between the safeties. At the snap of the ball, many times the safeties will move toward the sidelines in order to cover any long passes to quick wide receivers. This movement creates a natural hole between the safeties that can be attacked. By sending a receiver (usually a tight end) into the hole (in the middle of the field), the offense forces the safety to make a decision: play the vulnerable hole or help out on the wide receiver. The quarterback reads the safety's decision and decides on the best matchup (i.e., which mismatch is better: tight end vs. safety or wide receiver vs. cornerback).  This disadvantage is ameliorated somewhat in the Tampa 2 variation, however in moving the middle linebacker into deep coverage, it opens up the "underneath" center zone in the 5-10 yard range.

Another disadvantage of Cover 2 is that it leaves only seven men in the "box" (the area near the ball at the snap) to defend against the run. In contrast Cover 1 and Cover 3 usually have eight men in the box.

A potential problem with the Cover 2 is that defensive pressure on the Quarterback must be provided nearly exclusively by the front linemen as all other defenders are involved in pass coverage. If the defensive linemen do not provide adequate pressure on the Quarterback, the offense is afforded plenty of time to create and exploit passing opportunities. Blitzing in the Cover 2 often creates greater areas of weakness in the defense than other coverages. Thus, unsuccessful blitzes can prove to be more productive for the offense than in other schemes.

Cover 3

In Cover 3, the two corners and free safety each have responsibility for a deep third of the field, while the strong safety plays like a linebacker. This coverage is generally considered to be a run stopping defense as it focuses on preventing big pass plays and stopping the run while giving up short passes.

On the snap, the CBs work for depth, backpedaling into their assigned zone. One safety moves toward the center of the field. The other safety is free to rotate into the flat area (about 2–4 yards beyond the line of scrimmage), provide pass coverage help, or blitz.

Advantages
One of the biggest benefits of the Cover 3 coverage scheme is the ability to walk the strong safety up into the box with minimal to no changes in the coverage due to the pre-snap center field position of the free safety. This enables the defense to play strong against the run, but still prevent explosion plays such as a long pass or break away run. This advantage is most pronounced versus two tight end sets which naturally creates 8 holes for running backs, whereas in cover 2 schemes there are only 7 defenders in the box leaving 1 hole uncovered, or requiring a defender to cover 2 holes.

Disadvantages
Cover 3 schemes are susceptible to short, timed passes to the outside due to the hard drop of both cornerbacks. This puts pressure on the outside linebackers to react to pass plays and get into their drop quickly if they need to cover a receiver.

Another disadvantage of Cover 3 schemes is they are relatively easy to diagnose by opposing quarterbacks. Because of this, teams will often employ slight wrinkles in their coverage to confuse offenses. An example of this includes employing man coverage on one side and zone on another or swapping coverage zones between defenders. It also leaves the seams open, and makes the safety choose a man to cover on four verticals, which leaves one open.

Cover 4
Cover 4 refers to 4 deep defenders each guarding one-fourth of the deep zone. Cover 4 schemes are almost always used to defend against deep passes. (see also Prevent defense).

The most basic Cover 4 scheme involves 3 CBs and 2 safeties. Upon snap, the CBs work for depth, backpedaling into their assigned zone. Both safeties backpedal towards their assigned zone.

As with other coverage shells, Cover 4 is paired with underneath man or zone coverage in its most basic form.

Advantages
The main advantage of a Cover 4 defense is that it is extremely difficult for even the best quarterbacks to complete long passes against it. Therefore, this coverage is generally used as a prevent defense to be used near the end of a game or half, meaning that the defense sacrifices the run and short pass to avoid giving up the big play with the confidence that the clock will soon expire.

Cover 4 also has the advantage of using safeties in run support as opposed to cornerbacks as would be the case in a Cover 2 scheme. This gives the defense nine in the box and the ability to stop the run with an extra defender on either side. The play-side safety would come up in support on a running play while the back-side safety would be responsible for the middle third of the field and the cornerbacks would have the deep outside thirds.

Disadvantages
The main weakness of Cover 4 shells is the large amount of space left open by the retreating defensive backs. Since the defensive backs are working for depth, short pass routes underneath can enable the quarterback to make short- and medium- length passes, as well as isolate a defensive back on a wide receiver near the sideline with little help.

Cover 6

Cover 6 call defensive strength to the Field instead of to the offensive formation or front, and organize personnel by Field-side player and Boundary-side player. The position of the ball on the field therefore dictates strength of the offense. In Cover 6 the field safety and field corner cover fourths of the field, and depend on a field outside linebacker to support underneath them. The free safety covers the boundary-side deep half and the boundary corner plays the flat. Thus the field side of the coverage is quarters, and the boundary side is cover 2.

The Cover 6 gets its name from the fact that it combines elements of the Cover 2 (the strong safety covering half the field) and the Cover 4 on the opposite side. 

On the strong side, the corner and safety play "Cover 4 rules", which as above the corner and safety each have a quarter of the field working for depth in their zones. The "Sam" linebacker will be dropping outside to cover the flats. If in 3-4 the Middle Backer will cover that sides hook to curl if not blitzing.

On the weak side, the corner and safety play "Cover 2 rules", which as above the corner stays home in the flats, and the safety covers the deep half. The "Will" backer will play hook to curl or blitz depending on the call. If in 3-4 usually the "Will" or the Middle Backer will blitz from that side.

The Cover 6 is also good for calling a corner blitz from the weak side, and having the backer cover flats instead.

Advantages
Cover 6 blends the best of Cover 2 and Cover 4. On the boundary, Cover 6 uses a Cover 2 corner. The boundary corner sits at 5–7 yards and is in excellent position to attack flat passes and wide runs, as well as blitz from a short field position. The boundary safety plays at 12–15 yards and supports the boundary corner, providing good pass defense over the top, as well as being able to assist on any vertical release by a 3rd receiver from the field side. The field safety plays a hard read technique from 7–8 yards, reading first for run. He will fit hard and fast on run plays. He defends the pass by squatting or dropping over the #2 wide receiver. He will then play vertical patterns and in patterns by #2 then #1, passing off inside patterns. The Field corner plays a quarters deep coverage from 7–8 yards, reading the #1 wide receiver and playing all vertical and outside patterns.

Disadvantages
Cover 6 has the disadvantages of both Cover 2 and Cover 4. The field side is generally soft on flat coverage. The field side corner can be left in single coverage deep as well. On runs, the field side may be spread by a tight end and 2 receiver formation, offering an advantage on the edge. The Boundary side is hard behind the corner to the sideline, as well as in the seam between corner and linebacker.

Cover 0
Cover 0 refers to pure man coverage with no deep defender. Similar to Cover 1, Cover 0 has the same strengths and weaknesses but employs an extra rusher at the expense of deep coverage help leaving each pass defender man-to-man. Cover 0 is an aggressive scheme that allows for numerous blitz packages, as it's easier for players to drop off their coverage and rush the quarterback. However, there is no "help over the top"—if a wide receiver "beats" (achieves separation from) his defender, there is no one left in the secondary who can make up the coverage on the receiver, which could result in an easy pass completion and possible touchdown.

Tampa 2

Tampa 2 refers to a style of defense played by the Tampa Bay Buccaneers and implemented by its coaches, Tony Dungy, Lovie Smith, and Monte Kiffin, in recent years. Because of its success it has become popular with many professional and college teams. It blends the Cover 2 and Cover 3 defenses by having two defensive backs, usually the safeties, in deep coverage on either side of the field, and a middle linebacker covering the medium to deep middle. Its benefit over the Cover 2 is that the sidelines and middle of the field are better protected against deep threats, with the drawback being a larger open area in the short middle of the field underneath the middle linebacker. Its benefit over the Cover 3 is that it only dedicates two defensive backs to deep coverage rather than three, allowing for better protection against short outside routes. The Tampa 2 generally requires a quick and agile middle linebacker who is capable of staying with tight ends and wide receivers in pass coverage.

See also
American football strategy

References
Notes

Bibliography
 Bernstein, Steve (2000) The Three Deep Zone Coverage in Defensive Football Strategies. American Football Coaches Association.
 Jaworski, Ron; Cosell, Greg; and Plaut, David (2010) The Games that Changed the Game. New York: Ballantine.
 Vanderlinden, Ron (2008) Football's Eagle and Stack Defenses. Human Kinetics,

American football strategy
American football formations